Pampally (born 1979), is an Indian film director and screenwriter from Kerala state.

His debut feature film, Sinjar, was selected as the Best Feature Film in Jasari and the Best Debut Film of a Director at the 65th National Film Awards in 2018.

Pampally became a Jury Member of the 67th National Film Awards 
 and a selection committee member for India's official entry in best foreign language film category of Oscar Awards 2021, organized by the Film Federation of India.

Awards

Feature films

References

External links 
 

 Pampally receiving National Film Award from the President of India

1979 births
Living people
Malayalam film directors
Malayalam screenwriters
Malayalam-language writers